David Ekerot and Jeff Tarango were the defending champions, but competed this year with different partners. Ekerot teamed up with Peter Nyborg and lost to tournament winners Nicklas Kulti and Mikael Tillström, while Tarango teamed up with Jack Waite and lost in semifinals to tournament runners-up Magnus Gustafsson and Magnus Larsson.

Kulti and Tillström won the title by defeating Gustafsson and Larsson 6–0, 6–3 in the final. The final saw an unusual event, as both pairs were wild cards.

Seeds

Draw

Draw

References

External links
 Official results archive (ATP)
 Official results archive (ITF)

Doubles
Swedish Open
Swed